Deoxycortisone, or desoxycortisone, may refer to:

 11-Dehydrocorticosterone (17-deoxycortisone; 21-hydroxypregn-4-ene-3,11,20-trione)
 11-Deoxycortisol (11-deoxycortisone; 17α,21-dihydroxypregn-4-ene-3,20-dione)
 21-Deoxycortisone (17α-hydroxypregn-4-ene-3,11,20-trione)

See also
 Deoxycorticosterone
 Deoxycortisol

Pregnanes